9 Fingers or Nine Fingers may refer to:

 , a 2017 film by  that earned the Best Direction Award (Locarno International Film Festival)
 9 Fingers (aka Nine Fingers), a 1993 audio-visual work by Spaceballs (demogroup)